The discography of English-Irish vocalist/rapper Maverick Sabre consists of four studio albums, one mixtape, one extended play and eighteen singles (and an additional nineteen as a featured artist).

Sabre released his debut single, "Let Me Go" in the United Kingdom on 22 July 2011. The track peaked at number sixteen on the UK chart, also reaching number twenty-seven and number thirty-eight on the Scottish chart and Irish chart respectively. The release was succeeded by second single, "I Need", which was released on 4 November 2011. The track saw Sabre achieve a second consecutive top twenty hit, peaking at number eighteen in the UK; also reaching number twenty-four and number forty in Scotland and Ireland. The singer's debut studio album, Lonely Are the Brave, was released on 6 February 2012—debuting at number two in the UK and Scotland and number three in Ireland. The album was preceded by the release of a third single, "No One", which peaked at number fifty in the UK.

The singer has also appeared as a featured artist on two occasions, the first on British rapper Professor Green's single "Jungle", taken from the album Alive Till I'm Dead (2010). The track was released on 3 January 2011 in the UK, peaking at number thirty-one. Sabre also appeared alongside Green on True Tiger's "In the Air", which, having been released on 22 June 2011, peaked at number fifty-two.

Albums

Studio albums

Mixtapes

Extended plays

Singles

As lead artist

As featured artist

Promotional singles

Guest appearances

Music videos

References

Footnotes

Sources

Discographies of British artists